Tækniskólinn ( Technical College) is an upper secondary school in Reykjavík, Iceland, providing both vocational and specialized programmes. It was formed in 2008 through the merger of its two predecessors: Iðnskólinn í Reykjavík and Fjöltækniskólinn. It is subdivided into 13 trade-specific schools, which collectively make up one of the largest schools in the country.

These schools are located at Skólavörðuholt, 101 Reykjavík:
School of Building and Construction Trades
School of Design and Handicraft
School of Electrical Technology
School of General Academic Studies and Design
School of Handicraft - Hair, Gold and Clothes
School of Continuing Education

Located at Háteigsvegur, 105 Reykjavík:
School of Information Technology
School of Engine Technology
School of Navigation
Reykjavik Academy of Technology

The school is owned by the following Icelandic business organizations:
The Federation of Icelandic Fishing Vessel Owners
The Federation of Icelandic Industries
Samorka – Icelandic Energy & Utilities
The Icelandic Shipowners' Association

External links
 Official website

Educational institutions established in 2008
Secondary schools in Iceland
2008 establishments in Iceland